Murchisonia was a genus of perennial herbs in the family Asparagaceae, subfamily Lomandroideae.

There were two known species. In 2016, both were recognized as closely related to Thysanotus species, therefore Murchsonia was merged into Thysanotus. The two recognized species were:
Murchisonia fragrans Brittan – now Thysanotus fragrans (Brittan) Sirisena, Conran & T.Macfarlane, endemic to Western Australia
Murchisonia volubilis  Brittan – now Thysanotus exfimbriatus Sirisena, Conran & T.Macfarlane, native to Western Australia, South Australia and the Northern Territory

References

Historically recognized angiosperm genera
Lomandroideae
Fossils of Georgia (U.S. state)